A generation  is "all of the people born and living at about the same time, regarded collectively."

Generation or generations may also refer to:

Science and technology
 Generation (particle physics), a division of the elementary particles
 Generation in carrier generation and recombination, a process with mobile charge carriers (semiconductors)
 Generation in biology, a (usually multicellular) life stage, see biological life cycle
 Electricity generation
 Programming language generations, classes of a programming style's power

Books
 Generations (Marvel Comics), a Marvel Comics series
 Superman & Batman: Generations, a DC Comics series
 Generations (book), a 1991 analysis of Anglo-American history by William Strauss and Neil Howe
GENERATION: 25 Years of Contemporary Art in Scotland, a series of visual arts projects, exhibitions and events
Generations (DC Comics), a limited series from DC Comics
The Generation: The Rise and Fall of the Jewish Communists of Poland, a 1991 book about Polish-Jewish history

Film and television 
 A Generation, a 1955 Polish film directed by Andrzej Wajda
Generation, a section of the Berlin International Film Festival comprising Generation Kplus and Generation 14plus
 Generation (2021 TV series), an American dramedy television series on HBO Max
 Generation (Canadian TV program), a Canadian current affairs television program which aired on CBC Television in 1965
 Generation (film), a 1969 film
 Generations, the second season of the American TV series Heroes
 Generations (American TV series), an American daytime soap opera that aired on NBC 1988–1991
 Generations (South African TV series), a South African soap opera that aired on SABC1 1994–2010
 Star Trek Generations, the seventh Star Trek film

Music 
 Generations, a folk duo consisting of Skylar Grey and her mother

Albums
 Generation (Anarchic System album) or the title song, 1975
 Generation (Audio Bullys album) or the title song, 2005
 Generation (Dexter Gordon album), 1973
 Generation (Hal Russell album) or the title song, 1982
 Generation (Kenny Burrell album) or the title song, 1987
 Generations (Bucky Pizzarelli and John Pizzarelli album), 2007
 Generations (Gary Burton album), 2004
 Generations (Journey album), 2005
 Generations (Pepper Adams and Frank Foster album) or the title song, 1985
 Generations, by Will Butler, 2020

Songs
 "Generation", by Arisa Mizuki from Arisa II: Shake Your Body for Me, 1992
 "Generation", by Black Rebel Motorcycle Club from Take Them On, On Your Own, 2003
 "Generation", by Emerson Hart, theme song for the TV series American Dreams, 2002
 "Generation", by Simple Plan from Simple Plan, 2008
 "Generations" (song), by Tetsuya Kakihara, 2013
 "Generations", by Don Diablo, 2014
 "Generations", by Inspiral Carpets from Revenge of the Goldfish, 1992
 "Generations", by Sara Groves from Conversations, 2001
 Generation (Acid Angel from Asia song), 2022

Video games 
 The Sims 3: Generations, a 2011 expansion pack for the video game The Sims 3

Other
 Generation Investment Management, a London-based asset management firm founded by Al Gore
Generation (play), 1965 play
 Generation ship, a hypothetical type of starship that travels great distances for hundreds of years, requiring multiple generations of the occupants to complete the trip

See also
 Generate (disambiguation)
 Generator (disambiguation)
 First generation (disambiguation)
 Second generation (disambiguation)
 Third generation (disambiguation)
 Fourth generation (disambiguation)
 Fifth generation (disambiguation)
 Sixth generation (disambiguation)
 Seventh generation (disambiguation)
 Life cycle (disambiguation)